Suhrawardy Udyan formerly known as Ramna Race Course ground is a national memorial located in Dhaka, Bangladesh. It is named after Huseyn Shaheed Suhrawardy. Originally it served as the military club of the British soldiers stationed in Dhaka. It was then called the Ramna Race Course and later Ramna Gymkhana. After the end of colonial rule, the place – sometimes referred to as Dhaka Race Course – was used for legal horse racing on Sundays.

It is also a historical place because Bangabandhu Sheikh Mujibur Rahman delivered his 7th March speech here. On December 16, 1971, the Pakistan Army surrendered to the Mitro Bahini in this ground. The erstwhile Hotel Intercontinental, located near the race course ground, was initially designated as the surrender site for the Pakistan Army, but later this ground was selected for the surrender.

It is the resting place of three great national leaders, Sher-i-Bangla A.K. Fazlul Huq (1873–1962), Huseyn Shaheed Suhrawardy (1892–1963) and Khwaja Nazimuddin (1894–1964). Ramna Race Course was renamed after Huseyn Shaheed Suhrawardy. A Mughal structure named the Dhaka Gate was built adjacent to the park area of Suhrawardy Udyan. The gate was built by Mir Jumla II in 1660s.

The Museum of Independence, Dhaka is situated within the park area. The museum depicts the history of the nation since Mughal tenure to independence in 1971. The museum was opened to the public on 25 March 2015, the 45th Independence Day of Bangladesh.

Liberation war events
The field was an important venue for the events of 1971 liberation war:
 1969: A civic reception was organised at the Ramna Racecourse in honour of Sheikh Mujibur Rahman on his release from jail and he was accorded the title Bangabandhu in the reception.
 3 January 1971: Awami League arranged a huge public meeting at Ramna Racecourse ground and all the elected members of the National Assembly, in which the party owned majority, publicly took oath of not betraying the cause of the Bengali people under any circumstances.
 7 March 1971: At a mammoth gathering, Mujibur Rahman delivered his historic 7th March speech and virtually declared independence by saying that "the struggle this time is the struggle for freedom; the struggle this time is the struggle for independence."
 26 March 1971: The Pakistani army rolled into Dhaka University for Operation Searchlight.
 27 March 1971: The Pakistani army rolled into Ramna Kali Temple for Ramna Massacre.
 16 December 1971: The nation achieved victory when the Pakistani army surrendered formally at the Ramna (Suhrawardy Uddyan). It is now observed as the Victory Day.
 17 March 1972: Mammoth public meeting jointly addressed by the Indian Prime Minister Indira Gandhi and Mujibur Rahman was another important event that took place at Suhrawardy Uddyan.

The place is also etched in history as it was here that Sheikh Mujibur Rahman made his historic "This time the struggle is for our freedom" speech that inspired Bengalis to prepare for the freedom struggle. The original Flag of Bangladesh was also hoisted here for the second time since it was first unfurled at the University of Dhaka and the first time it was flown at such a large public gathering in Bangladesh. It was also the site of the centuries-old Ramna Kali Temple, a Hindu temple and Dhaka landmark that was razed to the ground by the Pakistan Army on 27 March 1971 in the Ramna massacre that led to the death of over 200 people, mostly Hindus.

Incidentally it became the setting for the surrender of the Pakistan Army under Lt. Gen. A. A. K. Niazi on 16 December 1971 after their defeat in the Bangladesh Liberation War to the Indian Army led by Lt. Gen. Jagjit Singh Aurora. The instrument of surrender was signed at this place and the date is celebrated by Bangladeshis as Victory Day. The place is currently maintained as an historic park with an eternal flame set up in 1996 to symbolise freedom.

Features

See also

 Bangladesh Liberation War
 Museum of Independence, Dhaka
 Dhaka Gate
 Ramna Park

References

Sports venues in Bangladesh
Bangladesh Liberation War
Horse racing venues in Bangladesh
Monuments and memorials in Dhaka